Soarin', also known as Soarin' Around the World, Soaring Over the Horizon and Soaring: Fantastic Flight, is a flight motion simulator attraction at Disney California Adventure, Epcot, Shanghai Disneyland, and Tokyo DisneySea. It employs a mechanical lift system, a 
projected presentation on an  concave 180-degree dome screen, and artificial scents and wind to simulate a hang gliding flight over locations in six of the world's continents. Many consider it the first flying theater.

The attraction's first iteration, Soarin Over California, was an opening-day attraction at Disney California Adventure on February 8, 2001. It took guests over several locations in California and included a pre-show on the history of California's aviation industry. It was also installed at Epcot in Walt Disney World as Soarin in 2005. 

The current global version of the ride debuted at Shanghai Disneyland Park as Soaring Over the Horizon on June 16, 2016. The American versions were also replaced with the new film as Soarin Around the World on June 17. A fourth attraction, Soaring: Fantastic Flight, opened at Tokyo DisneySea on July 23, 2019.  The original Soarin' Over California returned to Disney California Adventure for a limited engagement in June 2019, and its popularity led Disney to extend the run through the end of August of that year. Another limited run began February 28, 2020, as part of the park's Food & Wine Festival, but was cut short when the resort closed on March 13 due to the COVID-19 pandemic. On February 13, 2022, Disney announced Soarin' Over California would return on March 4 for Disney California Adventure Annual Food & Wine Festival.

Ride design

Soarin was first conceptualized in 1996 as Ultra Flight, a name that can still be seen on the tower consoles of the California Adventure attraction. It was to feature an OMNIMAX screen with an inverted track, allowing guests to fly over California's landmarks. It was to have three load levels, with a system operating on a horizontal cable, much like a dry cleaner's rack. The plan was abandoned when it was determined that the design's construction and labor costs would be prohibitive. It seemed that Soarin wouldn't become a reality until engineer Mark Sumner developed a different idea for the ride vehicles, using an Erector Set and string to create a working model. The new design allowed Disney to efficiently load guests on one level instead of three, significantly cutting its building costs.

Each ride vehicle consists of three rows of seats under a wing-like canopy, with a capacity of 87 guests. After guests have been safely restrained in the vehicle with standard lap belts, the canopy descends slightly and a cantilever system lifts the chairs forward and into the air with the guests' feet dangling freely. The vehicle is lifted forward so that guests look into a large, concave movie screen onto which aerial views are projected. The original film's scenes were shot at an IMAX HD frame rate of 48 frames per second, twice the conventional rate of regular films. The vehicle is moved forward toward the center of the dome so guests can see only the projected images and experience the sensation of flight.  The ride structure contains about one million pounds (454,000 kg) of steel; 37 tons (33.5 metric tonnes) are lifted during each ride cycle.

To enhance the illusion, subtle vertical movements of the seats are synchronized to the film. Sensations of horizontal motion are created with a combination of vertical carriage movement and turning the image on the screen. Scents complementing the scenes are also injected into the air streams blowing on riders. When it opened, the scent was only present during the Redwood Creek scene and the Valencia Orange Farms scene. In the updated show, scents include rose blossoms in the Taj Mahal scene, grass in the Africa scene, and a sea breeze in the South Pacific scene.

Versions

Disney California Adventure 

Soarin Around the World is in the Grizzly Peak Airfield section of Disney California Adventure at the Disneyland Resort. One of the resort's most popular attractions, it utilizes the park's FastPass system, allowing guests to reserve specific ride times to avoid long queues.

While in line, guests pass the Wings of Fame, an homage to California's aviation history, including profiles of the P-51 Mustang, SR-71 Blackbird, and Bell X-1. There is also a section dedicated to aviators such as John J. Montgomery, Amelia Earhart, Jimmy Doolittle, Charles Lindbergh, Jack Northrop, the Wright brothers, Howard Hughes, Jacqueline Cochran, Kelly Johnson, Paul MacCready, and Chuck Yeager. Inspirational music from a variety of aviation-related films is played in the queue areas, including Patton, MacArthur, Air Force One, The Blue Max, Explorers (all by Jerry Goldsmith), The American President (by Marc Shaiman), DragonHeart, Dragon: The Bruce Lee Story, Angels in the Outfield (1994) (both by Randy Edelman), The Last Starfighter (by Craig Safan), Apollo 13, and The Rocketeer (both by James Horner), Always (by John Williams) and the HBO miniseries Band of Brothers (by Michael Kamen). The Air Force Song and "Jupiter" from Gustav Holst's orchestral suite The Planets are also heard, based on their use in The Right Stuff.

Before entering the theater area, guests are placed in one of three preshow areas, called Alpha Gate, Bravo Gate, and Charlie Gate (named for the first three letters of the NATO phonetic alphabet). Just before boarding, guests see a pre-boarding video hosted by their chief flight attendant, Patrick Warburton.

The attraction opened with the park in 2001 as Soarin Over California in what was then the park's Condor Flats area. In early 2015, it closed for refurbishment as the surrounding area was transformed into Grizzly Peak Airfield. It reopened on May 15, 2015, with new exterior theming and updates to its screen and projection system. It now utilizes a laser illuminated digital projection array, replacing its original IMAX systems. Several exterior changes include the replacement of the mock-up RS-25 rocket engine with a fire lookout tower.

From January to March 2016, the attraction intermittently operated as Soarin Over California to prepare for the introduction of the Soarin Around the World ride film. The original film was shown until June 16, when the attraction was closed to prepare for the new film's debut on June 17.

 Soarin Over California Return Engagements

Since Soarin Around the World's opening on June 17, 2016, visitors to Disney California Adventure are usually able to find Soarin Around the World' playing. However, on various occasions, Disney has brought back the original Soarin Over California for return engagements.

The first was on May 23, 2019, Disney announced that Soarin Over California would temporarily return to the park for the month of June, following the opening of Star Wars: Galaxy's Edge at Disneyland Park on May 31. On June 21, they announced that the limited return had been extended to August 31, 2019, due to popular demand. 

On February 28, 2020, the California version of the ride returned to California Adventure for the Disney California Adventure Food & Wine Festival. The limited engagement was scheduled to run through April 21, but ended prematurely when the resort began its extended closure due to the COVID-19 pandemic on March 13. When the resort reopened on April 30, 2021, "Soarin' Around the World" was being shown.

Soarin Over California Runs

ORIGINAL RUN: February 8, 2001 - June 15, 2016

FIRST RETURN: May 31, 2019 - August 31, 2019

SECOND RETURN: February 28, 2020 - March 13, 2020

THIRD RETURN: March 4, 2022  - April 26, 2022

FOURTH RETURN: March 3, 2023 - April 25, 2023

Epcot

The attraction was duplicated, simply as Soarin, and officially opened inside "The Land" pavilion at Epcot in Walt Disney World on May 5, 2005, along with Lights, Motors, Action!: Extreme Stunt Show at Disney's Hollywood Studios as part of the Happiest Celebration on Earth festival. Unlike the Disney California Adventure version, the show had guests taking flights to California. The concept was reinforced with theming of guests being loaded into "gates", with airport-themed spiels referring to "Flight 5505", an homage to the attraction's opening day. Cast members wear costumes resembling flight attendant uniforms, whereas the California version wear airfield crew uniforms.

The Epcot queue originally had pictures of natural wonders from around the world, not just California. It currently utilizes a new infrared technology that allows guests to participate in interactive games. In 2009, this interactive technology appeared in the Magic Kingdom as part of a seven-month overhaul of Space Mountain.

The attraction closed for refurbishment on January 4, 2016, and was originally slated to reopen on June 17, with a third theater to coincide with the release of the new Soarin Around the World film. The ride reopened with the original film on May 27, and the change to the new film occurred on June 17, 2016.

Shanghai Disneyland Park 
The attraction was retooled as Soaring Over the Horizon for Shanghai Disneyland Park. It was not part of the park's original plan, but was added to it after Walt Disney Imagineering began developing similar attractions for the U.S. parks. Located in the park's Adventure Isle area, it opened with the park on June 16, 2016.

Embedded in the Adventure Isle setting, the attraction is presented as an ancient observatory and temple to the Arbori tribe's Condor god. The preshow and safety spiel are hosted by a shaman of the tribe who grants guests the ability of flight, but has trouble controlling her own shapeshifting abilities.

Tokyo DisneySea

On April 27, 2016, Tokyo Disney Resort announced a number of coming attractions for Tokyo Disneyland and Tokyo DisneySea parks, including a proposed version of Soarin (titled Soaring: Fantastic Flight) to be in the Mediterranean Harbor section of Tokyo DisneySea. The announcement said this version would have a different theme, with ride vehicles designed as Renaissance-era Dream Flyers created by aviatrix and Society of Explorers and Adventurers member Camellia Falco. It opened on July 23, 2019.

In this version of the attraction, rather than an aviation terminal, it is set in the Museum of Fantastic Flight, which is hosting a retrospective on the life of Camellia Falco. Her spirit takes guests to see some of her Dream Flyer gliders, and invites them on a flight of fantasy around the world. (Falco's name was first seen by guests at Disneyland's Tropical Hideaway restaurant as one of the names on a series of oars belonging to members of the Society.)

Two other differences can be seen in this version of the film: The Paris scene is replaced with Tokyo at sunset, with Mount Fuji in the background; and the finale is a flight over Tokyo DisneySea.

Ride films

Soarin' Over California

The original ride film, which lasts four minutes and 51 seconds, takes guests on a simulated hang-glider tour of California. Appropriate scents (citrus, pine, sagebrush, ocean mist) fill the air as the ride vehicles move gently to simulate the sensations of flight. In addition to the state's various landscapes, it also highlights its diverse recreation, including snow skiing, river rafting, kayaking, golf, horseback riding, hot air ballooning, surfing, and of course, hang gliding. Its locations are: 
 Golden Gate Bridge in San Francisco
 Redwood Creek in Humboldt County
 Napa Valley
 Monterey Bay Sanctuary
 Lake Tahoe and Heavenly Mountain Resort
 Yosemite Falls and Half Dome in Yosemite National Park 
 PGA West Palmer Course in La Quinta (credited in the queue as Palm Springs)
 Valencia orange groves over unincorporated Ventura County (credited as Camarillo)
 Anza-Borrego Desert State Park
 USS John C. Stennis (CVN-74) at Naval Air Station North Island in San Diego
 Malibu Beach
 Downtown Los Angeles
 Disneyland Resort in Anaheim

The original Soarin Over California ride film at both Disney California Adventure and Epcot has an orchestral score by Jerry Goldsmith, who is said to have come down from his first ride in tears. In addition to finding it visually beautiful and magical, he said that his father was a pilot who loved all things Californian. "I'd do anything to be part of this project," Goldsmith said. "I'd even score the film for free." His soundtrack plays during the entire attraction, starting with a crescendo in the low strings while the screen is still dark. Numerous variations of a serene theme for horn and strings are heard, and several statements of a fanfare accompanies the grandest vistas. The original ride score was included on Disneyland Resort and Walt Disney World official albums, including Walt Disney Records The Legacy Collection: Disneyland. It continues to be heard as ambient music in the Disneyland Resort Esplanade and Epcot's entrance plaza.

Soaring Over the Horizon, Soarin' Around the World, and Soaring: Fantastic Flight
An updated version of the Soarin attraction debuted at the Adventure Isle section of Shanghai Disneyland Park as Soaring Over the Horizon on June 16, 2016. On August 15, 2015, at the D23 Expo, it was announced that the attractions at Epcot and Disney California Adventure would debut versions of the new Soaring Over the Horizon ride film, titled Soarin Around the World, featuring locations, landscapes and landmarks across six continents. Unlike the original film, the updated version heavily utilizes computer generated imagery., including animated transitions between scenes, such as close encounters with a seaplane, a kite, and an eagle. The updated attractions opened on June 17, 2016, at Disney California Adventure and Epcot, along with a third theater for the latter location. The film's locations are:
 Matterhorn in Switzerland and Italy
 Isfjord, Greenland
 Port Jackson in Sydney, Australia
 Neuschwanstein Castle in Bavaria, Germany
 Kilimanjaro National Park and Mount Kilimanjaro in Tanzania
 The Great Wall of China in China
 The Great Pyramids in Egypt
 Taj Mahal in Uttar Pradesh, India
 West and East Mitten Buttes in Monument Valley, Arizona, United States
 Lau Islands, Fiji
 Iguazu Falls in Brazil and Argentina
 Eiffel Tower in Paris, France (Shanghai Disneyland version, Disney California Adventure version, Epcot version); Tokyo Tower in Tokyo (Tokyo DisneySea version)
 Lujiazui, Shanghai, China (Shanghai Disneyland version); Disneyland, California, United States (Disney California Adventure version); Epcot, Florida, United States (Epcot version); Tokyo DisneySea, Chiba (Tokyo DisneySea version)

Soarin Around the World and Soaring Over the Horizon received a new score by Bruce Broughton, heavily based on Goldsmith's original score, and performed by the London Studio Orchestra.

See also
 List of Disney California Adventure attractions
 List of Epcot attractions

References

  - Mechanism to lift riders into dome and simulate flight.
  - System to project into dome while maintaining illusion of being at the same point of view as the camera.

External links
 Disneyland Resort
 Walt Disney World Resort - Soarin'
 Shanghai Disneyland - Soaring Over the Horizon
 Tokyo DisneySea - Soaring: Fantastic Flight
 

Adventureland (Disney)
American adventure films
American short films
Amusement rides introduced in 2001
Amusement rides introduced in 2005
Amusement rides introduced in 2016
Amusement rides introduced in 2019
Amusement rides manufactured by Dynamic Structures
Aviation attractions
Condor Flats
Disney California Adventure
Epcot
Films scored by Bruce Broughton
Films scored by Jerry Goldsmith
Films set in Argentina
Films set in Bavaria
Films set in California
Films set in China
Films set in Egypt
Films set in Fiji
Films set in Florida
Films set in Greenland
Films set in Paris
Films set in Shanghai
Films set in Switzerland
Films set in Sydney
Films set in Tanzania
Films set in Tokyo
Films set in Utah
Films set in Uttar Pradesh
Films shot in Argentina
Films shot in Bavaria
Films shot in California
Films shot in China
Films shot in Egypt
Films shot in Fiji
Films shot in Florida
Films shot in Greenland
Films shot in Paris
Films shot in Shanghai
Films shot in Switzerland
Films shot in Sydney
Films shot in Tanzania
Films shot in Tokyo
Films shot in Utah
Films shot in Uttar Pradesh
Future World (Epcot)
Grizzly Peak (Disney California Adventure)
IMAX short films
Mediterranean Harbor (Tokyo DisneySea)
Shanghai Disneyland
Simulator rides
Tokyo DisneySea
Walt Disney Parks and Resorts attractions
Walt Disney Parks and Resorts films
World Nature
Films set in amusement parks
Films about fairies and sprites
Films set in resorts
Films set in Los Angeles
Films set in national parks
2001 films
2016 films